School District No. 48 (Sea to Sky) is a school district in British Columbia, Canada. The school district serves three major population centres along the Sea-to-Sky Corridor;  Squamish, Whistler and Pemberton. The District also serves six Aboriginal communities: Skwxwú7mesh Uxwumixw, Lil’wat Nation, N’Quatqua, Samhquam Ucwalmicw, Skatin Nations, Xa’xtsa, as well as the Métis, Inuit and Off-Reserve Aboriginal Nations. There are 16 schools in the school district.

Schools

See also
List of school districts in British Columbia

External links 

 School District #48: Sea to Sky

References 

Sea-to-Sky Corridor
48